Watertown City School District is a school district headquartered in Watertown, New York. It was first started in 1802, when the first school was erected.

Schools 
Secondary:
 Watertown High School
 Case Middle School

Primary:
Elementary schools:
 H. T. Wiley School
 Knickerbocker
North
Ohio
Sherman
Starbuck

Notable People 
Viggo Mortensen, American Actor, Best Known for the film Lord of the Rings and The Green Book.
Robert Lansing, U.S. Secretary of State, Inducted November 2, 2001 
Richard A. Dillan, Comic Book Artist, best known for his illustrations on Superman, Batman, Wonder Woman, Green Lantern and Blackhawk. Inducted 2020.
Mary-Margaret Humes, Actor, won the Miss Florida USA pageant and was third runner up in the 1975 Miss USA. Inducted 2020.
Mary Gay Scanlon, member of the United States House of Representatives. Inducted 2020.
Jim Berkman, head coach at Salisbury University. Inducted 2020.
Robert Purcell, financial advisor to the Rockefeller Family. Inducted June 13, 2014.

References

External links
 

School districts in New York (state)
Education in Jefferson County, New York